Alexander George Hanton (25 May 1922 – 5 September 2011) was an Australian rules footballer who played for the Carlton Football Club in the Victorian Football League (VFL).

Family
The son of William Mark Hanton (1878-1956), and Ellen Clement Hanton (1883-1962), née Annand, Alexander George Hanton was born at Frankston, Victoria on 25 May 1922.

Alex's twin brother, Harold Roy "Hal" Hanton (1922-2011), who also played for Carlton in the VFL, died just 9 days after Alex's death.

He married Valma Lillian Rinder (1936-1983).

Notes

References
 
 Connolly, Rohan, "Twins who signalled one of Carlton's great eras",The Age, Sunday, 24 April 2011.
 World War Two Nominal Roll: Signalman Alexander George Hanton (VX88810/V310317), Department of Veterans' Affairs.
 B883, VX88810: World War Two Service Record: Signalman Alexander George Hanton (VX88810), National Archives of Australia.

External links 

Alex Hanton's profile at Blueseum

1922 births
2011 deaths
Carlton Football Club players
Australian rules footballers from Melbourne
Australian twins
Twin sportspeople
People from Frankston, Victoria